Alicja Fiodorow-Jeromin (born 22 May 1985) is a Paralympic athlete from Poland competing mainly in category T46 sprint events.

She competed in the 2004 Summer Paralympics in Athens, Greece.  There she won a bronze medal in the women's 400 metres - T46 event, finished fourth in the women's 100 metres - T46 event and finished fourth in the women's 200 metres - T46 event. Competing in the 2008 Summer Paralympics in Beijing, China, she won a silver medal in the women's 200 metres - T46 event and a bronze medal in the women's 100 metres - T46 event.

At the 2012 Summer Paralympics in London, she won a silver medal in the women's 200 metres T46 event.

At the 2020 Summer Paralympics, she won the bronze medal in Women's 200 metres T47.

References

External links 

 
 Official website

1985 births
Living people
Paralympic athletes of Poland
Athletes (track and field) at the 2004 Summer Paralympics
Athletes (track and field) at the 2008 Summer Paralympics
Athletes (track and field) at the 2012 Summer Paralympics
Athletes (track and field) at the 2016 Summer Paralympics
Athletes (track and field) at the 2020 Summer Paralympics
Paralympic silver medalists for Poland
Paralympic bronze medalists for Poland
Polish female sprinters
People from Kozienice
Sportspeople from Masovian Voivodeship
Medalists at the 2004 Summer Paralympics
Medalists at the 2008 Summer Paralympics
Medalists at the 2012 Summer Paralympics
Medalists at the 2016 Summer Paralympics
Medalists at the 2020 Summer Paralympics
Paralympic medalists in athletics (track and field)
20th-century Polish women
21st-century Polish women